Shir Mohammad Bazar (also Romanized as Shīr Moḩammad Bāzār and Shīrmoḩammad Bāzār) is a village in Polan Rural District, Polan District, Chabahar County, Sistan and Baluchestan Province, Iran. At the 2006 census, its population was 178, in 46 families.

References 

Populated places in Chabahar County